Here Tonight may refer to:

 Here Tonight (Tim McGraw song)
 Here Tonight (Brett Young song)
 "Here Tonight", a song by Gene Clark from the album Roadmaster